William Turton (21 May 1762 – 28 December 1835) was an English physician and naturalist. He is known for his pioneering work in conchology, and for translating Linnaeus' Systema Naturae into English.

Biography 

He was born at Olveston, Gloucestershire and was educated at Oriel College, Oxford. He commenced in practice as a physician at Swansea, where he worked for fifteen years. He then moved in turn to Dublin, Teignmouth, and Torquay. He devoted his leisure time to natural history, especially conchology. He published several illustrated shell books, and a translation of Gmelin's edition of Linnaeus' Systema Naturae in 1806. His works on conchology have been described as "seminal".

In 1817, while he was a physician at Teignmouth, he treated Tom Keats, youngest brother of the Romantic poet John Keats, for consumption.

He moved to Bideford, Devon, in 1831, and died there. His shell collection is now located at the Smithsonian Institution.

The bivalve genus Turtonia (J. Alder, 1848) and the species Galeomma turtoni are named for him.

Bibliography 

  (free)
  (free)
 A Medical Glossary; in which the words in the various branches of medicine are deduced from their original languages, and explained (London, 1797, second edition 1802).
  (free)
 A Conchological Dictionary of the British Islands, by W. Turton, assisted by his daughter (London, 1819).

References

External links 
 

1762 births
1835 deaths
People from Olveston
Alumni of Oriel College, Oxford
English naturalists
English zoologists
Conchologists
English translators